René Pawlowitz (born 1975 in Frankfurt/Oder) is a Berlin-based techno DJ and producer, better known under his moniker Shed.

Life 
René Pawlowitz was born in 1975 in the East German town of Frankfurt/Oder and grew up in Schwedt/Oder. He started producing music in the 1990s.

In 2002 he moved to Berlin and founded his own label Soloaction Records, where he released his first EP Red Planet Express as Shed in 2004. His debut album Shedding the Past was named the album of the year 2008 by Resident Advisor. In 2010 the second album The Traveller was released.

Discography
Shedding the Past (2008)
The Traveller (2010)
The Killer (2012)
The Final Experiment (2017)
Oderbruch (2019)

As The Traveller 
A100 (EP, 2012)

References

External links
 

1975 births
German techno musicians
Living people
Musical groups from Berlin